Union Township is one of the twelve townships of Champaign County, Ohio, United States. The 2010 census reported 2,210 people living in the township, 2,106 of whom lived in the unincorporated portions of the township.

Geography
Located in the southeastern part of the county, it borders the following townships:
Wayne Township - north
Rush Township - northeast corner
Goshen Township - east
Pleasant Township, Clark County - south
Moorefield Township, Clark County - southwest
Urbana Township - west
Salem Township - northwest

The village of Mutual is located in the center of the township.

Name and history
Union Township was established about 1805, but since the records were lost the exact date is likely unknown.

It is one of twenty-seven Union Townships statewide.

Union Township is the location of a Native American mound, the Carl Potter Mound. Believed to be a work of the Adena culture, the mound is an archaeological site and is listed on the National Register of Historic Places.

Government
The township is governed by a three-member board of trustees, who are elected in November of odd-numbered years to a four-year term beginning on the following January 1. Two are elected in the year after the presidential election and one is elected in the year before it. There is also an elected township fiscal officer, who serves a four-year term beginning on April 1 of the year after the election, which is held in November of the year before the presidential election. Vacancies in the fiscal officership or on the board of trustees are filled by the remaining trustees.

References

External links
County website
County and township map of Ohio

Townships in Champaign County, Ohio
Townships in Ohio